Sofyinka is a rural locality (a selo) in Rostashevskoye Rural Settlement, Paninsky District, Voronezh Oblast, Russia. The population was 131 as of 2010. There are 2 streets.

Geography 
Sofyinka is located 4 km south of Panino (the district's administrative centre) by road. Panino is the nearest rural locality.

References 

Rural localities in Paninsky District